The Jet Pocket Top Must is a French paramotor that was designed by Phillippe Jeorgeaguet and produced by Jet Pocket of Chantelle, Allier for powered paragliding. Now out of production, when it was available the aircraft was supplied complete and ready-to-fly.

Design and development
The Top Must was designed to comply with the US FAR 103 Ultralight Vehicles rules as well as European regulations. It features a paraglider-style wing, single-place accommodation and a single  Zenoah G-25 engine in pusher configuration with a 2.9:1 ratio belt reduction drive and a  diameter two-bladed wooden propeller.

As is the case with all paramotors, take-off and landing is accomplished by foot. Inflight steering is accomplished via handles that actuate the canopy brakes, creating roll and yaw.

Reviewer Rene Coulon wrote in 2003 that the line of paramotors produced by the company were, "reliable, light, yet powerful, well balanced statically and dynamically."

Specifications (Top Must)

References

Top Must
2000s French ultralight aircraft
Single-engined pusher aircraft
Paramotors